Rally dos Sertões is a rally raid competition held in Brazil since 1993. Its name refers to the sertão region of countryside Brazil.

History
Its precursor was the "Rally São Francisco", organized in 1991 by the architect and racing enthusiast Chico Morais, inspired by the Paris-Dakar Rally. The then motorcycles-only competition started at Ribeirão Preto and finished at Maceió. The rally was first held with its current name in 1993, starting at Campos do Jordão and finishing at Natal; 34 competitors participated in the competition. The following year, 44 competitors took in. In 1995, the rally was open for automobiles  and in 1996, for drivers outside Brazil. Besides bikes and cars, the rally has categories for trucks, quad bikes and UTVs. In 2005, the Rally joined the FIM Cross-Country Rallies World Championship calendar.

Winners

References

External links
Official site

Rally raid races
1993 establishments in Brazil